Jesús "Jessie" Ortiz (born August 11, 2000), is an American soccer player who currently plays college soccer for the Seattle Redhawks men's soccer program.

Club career
Ortiz has played with the academy teams of the Houston Dynamo since 2014. During the 2016-17 season, he played for Houston's U-16 team, making two appearances for the U-18 team.

An Academy player competing as an amateur call-up to Houston's USL affiliate, the Rio Grande Valley FC Toros, Ortiz made his senior professional debut at the age of 16 on June 10, 2017, in a 3–1 RGV win over the Seattle Sounders 2. He replaced Emilio García in the 90th minute. During the summer of 2017, he made five appearances for the Brazos Valley Cavalry in the USL Premier Development League (PDL).

College 
Ahead of the 2019 NCAA Division I men's soccer season, Ortiz signed a National Letter of Intent to play college soccer for Seattle University. Ortiz was an immediate starter on the Redhawks program, making 20 appearances and scoring one goal in his freshman year.

References

External links
 
 
 Jessie Ortiz at USL PDL

2000 births
Living people
Association football midfielders
American soccer players
Brazos Valley Cavalry FC players
Rio Grande Valley FC Toros players
USL Championship players
USL League Two players
Seattle Redhawks men's soccer players
Soccer players from Houston